Jack Mathis may refer to:

 Jack W. Mathis (1921–1943), U.S. Army Air Forces officer and Medal of Honor recipient
 Jack Mathis (soccer) (born 1992), American soccer player